Espers was an independent comic book series created and written by James D. Hudnall. It centered on a disparate group of people with various psychic powers who are brought together under duress and later coalesce as a team. Espers was published intermittently in the 1980s and 1990s by four different companies, including Eclipse, Marvel, and Image, and was re-numbered from issue 1 again each time.

As the series evolved it was revealed that in the Espers' world people imbued with advanced psychic powers (known as 'espers') had been around for hundreds of years, but that their existence had been successfully kept from the general public by a secret conspiracy among a handful of powerful groups, including the Inner Circle, The Triad, and the S.E.A. (among others), all engaged in a generations-long war against one another in the shadows for power, control, and world domination. Events in the series, however, later make the existence of espers publicly known for the first time.

The first five issues in the series were published from 1986-1987 by Eclipse Comics. The first four issues were illustrated by David Lloyd, and the fifth by John Burns. The initial 4-issue story arc, later titled "Espers," introduced the main characters, including team leader Linda Williams, and told the story of their unsuccessful attempt to rescue her father (who had been taken hostage in Beirut by a front group for the Inner Circle). The fifth (and last) issue published by Eclipse was to be the first issue of the second story arc of the series, titled "The Liquidators." But the remaining issues in that story arc were never published by Eclipse, a decision that Hudnall himself attributed in print (in vol. 2, #1 from 1996) to disappointing sales and to an unspecified dispute between Eclipse and himself.

The series languished in limbo for the next couple of years. But it was ultimately moved to Marvel Comics' Epic imprint, where eight issues were published under the title "Interface" from 1989–1991. The first six issues of that series, featuring painted art by Paul Johnson, re-introduced the main characters and re-told the story from the original "Espers" 4-issue story arc in flashback form, before picking up the "Liquidators" story line that had begun in issue #5 from Eclipse. In these issues, the title characters come under simultaneous (but separate) attack from super- assassins hired by the Inner Circle and by the forces of mafia crime lord Benito Giovanetti. Giovanetti's background suggests a link between the Mob, the Inner Circle and the assassination of JFK. The Espers are aided by Alan Black, an assassin for the S.E.A. Issue 7 of this series was an epilogue to that second storyline, with painted art by Bill Koeb. And issue 8 (the last one from Epic) was a sort of dream issue featuring painted art by Dan Brereton. It details an encounter between the Espers and a Mind Dancer ("who tried to kill us with our own subconscious" Simon Ashley later recollects in vol. 3, issue 6), before they're aided by a mysterious 'Master' named Lori who taught them more about their powers before disappearing herself.

The series then suffered its second extended publishing hiatus, this time for over five years before Hudnall himself revived the series in 1996, self-publishing another six issues under his own Halloween Comics imprint from 1996-1997. These issues were numbered as volume 2; 1-6, and comprised the "Undertow" story arc, featuring B&W line art by then-newcomer Greg Horn. Reflecting the real-life publishing schedule of the series, the events in these issues take place several years after those detailed in "Interface." In this story arc, the Espers come to the rescue of a 17-year-old high school girl from California named Skye Lanning, a petulant teenager possessed of powerful psychometric powers, who is being pursued by both the Triad and the Inner Circle. The Espers try to convince a reluctant Skye to join their team instead, for her own protection. The story culminates in a final battle at an Inner Circle headquarters hidden in plain sight at Disney World in Florida.

During that battle it's revealed that all the world's espers originated from a secret human breeding program masterminded by a shadowy group called the "Architects," whose origins date back to the American Revolutionary War. The Architects have sought to alter humanity over hundreds of years through breeding and mysticism. The Inner Circle was formed from this organization in 1880. But then in 1922 a group of espers fled this selective breeding program. The title characters in "Espers" are descended from them, it's revealed at the end of the story, which is why they're referred to as "Renegades" by the Inner Circle and the Triad.

The series was then moved to Image Comics, a decision which Hudnall explained in print at the time as one intended to make the series more broadly available via Image than he could under his own imprint. Image published another seven issues of the series from 1997-1998 (numbered as volume 3; 1-7), the first six of which again featured art by Greg Horn. The first four issues of that run comprised the "Black Magic" story arc. In "Black Magic," the Espers come under attack by the occult branch of the Architects called "The Pentacle," while trying to stop the Architects' master plan to turn the US Navy's High Frequency Active Aural Research Project, or HAARP (described as, "an array of antennae pumping high doses of energy into the ionosphere turning it into a transmitter blanketing the Earth")into "the most powerful mind control device on the planet."

In issue 5, the Espers go in search of Alan Black in Chicago, believing that they cannot battle the Architects without the help of the S.E. A. In issue 6, Alan and Simon travel to an S.E.A. cell in Siberia, and Simon finds the 'Master' Lori, too. The last issue (#7) contained art by Gene Gonzales and detailed a trip by Bill, Maria, and Ian to Rio to try to liaise with the Triad, which dominates the city. The series has not seen publication again since issue 7 was published by Image Comics in 1999.

Main characters

The inside front covers to each issue of Marvel's 1989 "Interface" series contained the following short summaries about each of the main characters:

"LINDA WILLIAMS (USA) Wealthy. Brought the Espers together by stealing their names from a CIA databank. Linda can tap into computers, devices and the electro-magnetic spectrum psychically.

"IAN McVICAR (ENGLAND) Professional art smuggler. Trained Espers for Beirut operation. Ian shifts into time at a different rate than everyone else, becoming super-fast.

"WILLIAM SILENT BEAR (USA) Car mechanic from North Dakota. Now just wants to travel in Europe. Can levitate himself or other objects. Can also deflect bullets with his mind.

"MARIA RIVAS (ARGENTINA) Left-wing journalist on the run from right-wing death squads. Maria has the ability to teleport and levitate objects inside an aura force-field that surrounds her.

"JIRO YABUKI (JAPAN) Was a student planning to go to the university in the fall. Can generate energy of varying types with his mind., channeling it through his arms and hands.

"SIMON ASHLEY (JAMAICA) Was a hotel chef. Now wants to open his own restaurant in Monaco. Can generate heat and flames with his mind. Can create a heat shield around self that vaporizes bullets."

The "Undertow" story arc from 1996 added another new character, a 17-year-old high school student from Studio City, California named Skye Lanning. She is described as a 'psychometric' who can "read the history of any object by touch." Skye explains her powers to her own mother as follows, "I see visions when I touch stuff. And it tells me about the person who used it."

Adversaries

In the "Undertow" story arc, Bill Silent Bear gives new member Skye Lanning a summary of the adversaries their team is up against. "There are two dark esper groups. The Triad's mainly a criminal branch... They deal in drugs, terrorism, the usual crap. But the [Inner] Circle, they're the real bad boys... They're political, doing things behind the scenes to start wars, destroy economies... and worse." In issue 4 of the "Interface" story arc, Alan Black explains to Linda Williams that, "The Inner Circle is mostly European in origin. The Triad is extensively Asian. Both groups are trying to control the world. They manipulate events from behind the scenes."

A murderous telekinetic named Sergei Koznishev, who is described as a "high level member of the Inner Circle," first appears in the initial "Espers" story arc from 1986, running the Beirut operation. He appears again extensively in "Undertow."

During the final battle at the end of "Undertow," it's revealed that all the world's espers originated from a secret human breeding program masterminded by a shadowy group called the "Architects," whose origins date back to the American Revolutionary War. The Architects have sought to alter humanity over hundreds of years through breeding and mysticism. The Inner Circle was formed from this organization in 1880. But then in 1922 a group of espers fled this selective breeding program. The title characters in "Espers" are descended from them, it's revealed at the end of the story, which is why they're referred to as "Renegades" by the Inner Circle and the Triad. In vol.3, issue 7 it's made clear that the Triad is at odds with the Architects as well.

In the "Black Magic" story arc it's revealed that there is also on "occult branch" of the Architects called "The Pentacle." The Pentacle is led by Tracy King, a former reporter who has become possessed by an evil ancestor named Aldo Roth, described as "a rogue kabbalistic necromancer who died in 1787."

Allies

The Espers first encounter Alan Black in the "Interface" story arc. Alan, whose power is described as "psychic intuition," is an assassin for another, more benevolent group of espers, called the "Society of Esper Anarchists," or "S.E.A." The SEA is engaged in a centuries-long battle in the shadows against both the Inner Circle and the Triad.

Another friendly esper, Brian Marx, first appears in the "Black Magic" story arc. Brian is described as an "American random mage" and "a modern-day wizard using chaos magic which is supposed to let you bend reality." He's on the run from the Architects, most notably from the leader of their occult branch, "The Pentacle," Tracy King.

Trade Paperback Collections

Most (but not all) of the irregularly published issues of the series in its various incarnations have been collected in trade paperbacks over time. In 1995, Caliber Comics published a TPB titled "Espers," collecting the first four issues initially published by Eclipse in 1986. But this TPB collection omitted the fifth issue. In 1999, another TPB was published that collected all five issues originally published by Eclipse, titled "ESPERS: The Storm." In 1998, Image Comics published a TPB titled "ESPERS: Interface" that collected the first six issues of the "Interface" series from Marvel's "Epic" imprint. Also in 1998, Image Comics published a TPB collecting the entire 6 issue run from Halloween Comics under the title, "ESPERS: Undertow." And lastly, also in 1998, Image published a final TPB titled "ESPERS: Black Magic," collecting the first four Image Comics issues.

In the TPBs published by Image in 1998, another TPB is listed, called "ESPERS: Crossed Purposes." But it was never published.

Storylines

Espers: the first 4 issues initially published by Eclipse in 1986 (vol. 1). The Espers are assembled by Linda Williams and then go to Beirut to try to rescue her kidnapped father. But in the process they stumble upon a much bigger conspiracy.
Espers: Interface: 8 issues published by Marvel Comic's "Epic" line from 1989–1991; as well as one 'prologue' issue first published by Eclipse in 1987 as issue #5 of vol. 1. The Espers come under simultaneous (but separate) attack from super- assassins hired by the Inner Circle and by the forces of mafia crime lord Benito Giovanetti.
Espers: Undertow: 6 issues self-published by James Hudnall's Halloween Comics from 1996-1997 (vol. 2). In this story arc the Espers come to the rescue of a 17-year-old high school girl from California named Skye Lanning, a petulant teenager possessed of powerful psychometric powers, who is being pursued by the Triad and the Inner Circle.
Espers: Black Magic: the first 4 issues published by Image from 1997-1998 (vol. 3). In "Black Magic," the Espers come under attack by the occult branch of the Architects called the Pentacle while trying to stop the Architects' master plan to turn the US Navy's High Frequency Active Aural Research Project into, "the most powerful mind control device on the planet."
Espers: Crossed Purposes: the final 3 issues published by Image in 1998 (vol. 3) presumably would have been part of this next storyline. But it was never completed. Publication ceased after issue 7. In these three issues the Espers seek out the Triad and S.E.A. to try to convince them to unite against the Architects.

Influences

In the introduction to the "Espers" TPB published by Caliber in 1995, James Hudnall wrote of his influences when creating the series:

"My big influences at the time were my love for the spy genre and Japanese Anime films... I wanted to try something in those genres, not only because I love them but because there weren't any other books like that at the time. But I wanted it to appeal to super-hero fans, which still made up the bulk of readers in the industry..."

"When I was a kid there was a short-lived British TV series called The Champions about three people with psychic powers who worked for some mysterious agency in Geneva. They went around the world fighting various criminal masterminds and conspiracies. While I only had vague memories of the show, I remember liking the concept, so that's what I decided to do. Marry the spy genre with psychic super-heroes, only tone it down and make it more 'real.'"

References

External links
 The Espers at International Hero

Image Comics titles
Defunct American comics
Epic Comics titles
Eclipse Comics titles
Comic book limited series